= Gartu Monastery =

Religion
- Affiliation: Tibetan Buddhism

Location
- Location: Qinghai, China
- Country: India

Gartu Monastery is a Buddhist monastery in Qinghai, China.
